Robert A. Malkin is an engineer specializing in medical instrumentation for the developing world.

At Duke, Malkin is an Emeritus professor of the practice of Biomedical Engineering, professor of the practice of global health, and an affiliate of the Duke Initiative for Science & Society.

He is best known for his work concerning medical equipment design for the developing world, for which he was named among Today's Engineering Heroes by IEEE in 2015.

Pratt Pouch 
Among his work, the best-known technology is the "Pratt Pouch," a ketchup packet-like envelope containing antiretroviral drugs. The pouch is credited with saving thousands of lives in South America and Africa.

Named for Duke's Pratt School of Engineering, the pouch was developed by Malkin in collaboration with Duke undergraduate engineering students. In 2012, the World Health Organization placed the pouch on its Top 10 Most Innovative Health Technologies list.

Organizations Founded 
Malkin founded Engineering World Health, a nonprofit which delivers technical expertise and medical equipment to the developing world. He also founded The Global Public Service Academies an organization that places high school students in developing world clinics and hospitals. He also founded The International Research Institute of North Carolina an organization that places high school students in university laboratories.

Working at Duke, Malkin helped launch several efforts for making and distributing medical devices for the developing world including a bili light company called PhotoGenesis Medical and a colposcope project at Family Health Ministries.

Early Years and Education 

Born in Cleveland, Ohio, Malkin earned a master's and a PhD in electrical engineering from Duke University and two bachelor's from The University of Michigan.

Malkin is a fellow of the American Institute for Medical and Biological Engineering and an expert advisor to WHO committees on health care technology.

References 

Duke University faculty
Living people
University of Michigan College of Engineering alumni
Fellows of the American Institute for Medical and Biological Engineering
Year of birth missing (living people)
People from Cleveland
Duke University Pratt School of Engineering alumni